Stanley Mikita (born Stanislav Guoth; May 20, 1940 – August 7, 2018) was a Slovak-born Canadian ice hockey player for the Chicago Black Hawks of the National Hockey League, generally regarded as the best centre of the 1960s. In 2017, he was named one of the 100 Greatest NHL Players.
In 1961, he became the first Slovak-born player to win the Stanley Cup.

Early life
Mikita was born as Stanislav Guoth in Sokolče, Slovak Republic, during the brief period it came into existence as a client state of Nazi Germany.  He was raised in a small farming community until 1948, when he moved to St. Catharines, Ontario. He was adopted by his aunt and uncle, Anna and Joe Mikita, who had emigrated from Slovakia to Canada 20 years earlier and were childless. They came to Slovakia to visit the Guoth family before Christmas in 1948 and took the 8-year-old Stan with them when they went back to Canada. His parents believed that there was a brighter future for him in Canada than in then Communist Czechoslovakia, whose borders (including the area of Slovakia) had been reinstated at the end of World War II. His aunt and uncle also gave him their surname, and he anglicized his first name to Stanley.

Stan considered himself Slovak, and mentioned in interviews how proud he was of his Slovak origin.

Playing career
In his second full year, in 1961, the Black Hawks won their third Stanley Cup. The young centre led the entire league in goals during the playoffs, scoring a total of six.

The following season was his breakout year. Mikita became a star as centre of the famed "Scooter Line", with right wing Ken Wharram and left wingers Ab McDonald and Doug Mohns. The  season, an 87-point effort from Mikita, was the last year a Chicago player won the scoring title until Patrick Kane's 106-point  season.

In his early years, Mikita was among the most penalized players in the league, but he then decided to play a cleaner game and went on to win the Lady Byng Memorial Trophy for particularly sportsmanlike conduct combined with excellence twice. Mikita's drastic change in behavior came after he returned home from a road trip. His wife told him that while their daughter, Meg, was watching the Black Hawks' last road game on television, she turned and said, "Mommy, why does Daddy spend so much time sitting down?" The camera had just shown Mikita in the penalty box again.

During his playing career, in 1973, Mikita teamed up with Chicago businessman Irv Tiahnybik to form the American Hearing Impaired Hockey Association (AHIHA), to bring together deaf and hard-of-hearing hockey players from all over the country, and he founded the Stan Mikita School for the Hearing Impaired, inspired by a friend's deaf son who was an aspiring goalie. He also helped bring the Special Olympics to Chicago, bringing his family out to volunteer at races.

Internationally, Mikita played two games of the Summit Series in 1972 for Canada against Soviet Union, both of them in Canada, as well as two exhibition games also during the Summit Series, one against Sweden in Stockholm and one against Czechoslovakia in Prague. He also played several exhibition games for Czechoslovakia in summer 1967 when he came to his country of origin to visit his family.

Curved stick use
Mikita and teammate Bobby Hull were a well-known forward duo in the 1960s, gaining notoriety for using sticks with curved blades. Such sticks gave a comparative advantage to shooters versus goaltenders. As a result, the NHL limited blade curvature to ½" in 1970. Mikita reportedly began the practice after his standard stick got caught in a bench door, bending the blade before he hit the ice; he soon was borrowing a propane torch from team trainers to create a deliberate curve.

Mikita was also one of the first players to wear a helmet full-time, after a December 1967 game in which an errant shot tore a piece off one of his ears (it was stitched back on).

Retirement

Mikita's later years were marred by chronic back injuries, leading to his retirement as an active player on April 14, 1980. At that time, only Gordie Howe and Phil Esposito had scored more points in the NHL, and just six players had appeared in more games. Mikita was inducted into the Hockey Hall of Fame in 1983, and into the Slovak Hockey Hall of Fame in 2002.

After retiring, Mikita became a golf pro at Kemper Lakes Golf Club. His other business interests, under Stan Mikita Enterprises, included making the small plastic sauce containers that accompany chicken nuggets at McDonald's. He owned Stan Mikita's Village Inn in the 1960s and 1970s, located in the Oakbrook Shopping Center, Oak Brook, Illinois.

Mikita provided the foreword to the children's book My Man Stan by Tim Wendel. Mikita is featured as a main character in the book.

He became a goodwill ambassador for the Blackhawks' organization, and in fall of 2011, the Blackhawks raised a statue honouring Mikita at Gate 3½ at Chicago's United Center. For three decades the Blackhawks Alumni Association has hosted an annual golf tournament named in Mikita's honour.

, Mikita ranks 15th in regular-season points scored in the history of the NHL, and just three other players (Steve Yzerman, Alex Delvecchio, and Nicklas Lidström) have appeared in more games while playing for only one team over their careers.

Mikita appeared as himself in a cameo role in the 1992 film Wayne's World, which featured a "Stan Mikita" doughnut shop, spoofing the Canadian doughnut chain Tim Hortons (co-founded by Hockey Hall of Fame member Tim Horton). A restaurant named "Stan Mikita's" and closely resembling the movie's version opened in 1994 at the Virginia amusement park Kings Dominion and at Paramount Carowinds in Charlotte.

There was a REAL Stan Makita Donut Shop Near the Oshawa, Ontario Area around 1981-1982. I know because i went to it with a friend. So it was REAL and around way before the movie Waynes World.

Illness and death
On May 24, 2011, Mikita was diagnosed with oral cancer and began external beam radiation therapy. On January 30, 2015, the Chicago Tribune released this statement from his wife: "Stan has been diagnosed with suspected Lewy body dementia, a progressive disease, and was under the care of compassionate and understanding care givers". In June, 2015, it was stated that Mikita had no memory of his former life and was being cared for by his wife Jill.

Mikita died at the age of 78 on August 7, 2018. He was survived by his wife, four children and nine grandchildren. Mikita’s ashes are interred at Bronswood Cemetery in Oak Brook, Illinois. On September 14, 2019, it was reported by the Boston University CTE Center, that upon performing a posthumous study of Mikita's brain, it was found that he suffered from stage 3 chronic traumatic encephalopathy, or CTE, at the time of his death. This marked Mikita as the first Hall of Famer to ever have been diagnosed with the disease.

Career statistics

Regular season and playoffs

* Stanley Cup Champion.

Statistics via HockeyDB

Awards and accomplishments
 Ranked 14th all-time in points, 18th in assists, 31st in goals, and 40th in games played (at end of 2017-18 NHL season)
 Won the Hart Memorial Trophy as most valuable player in 1967 and 1968
 Won the Art Ross Trophy as leading scorer in 1964, 1965, 1967, and 1968
 Won the Lady Byng Memorial Trophy in 1967 and 1968
 Stanley Cup champion (1961)
 Named to the NHL's First All-Star Team in 1962, 1963, 1964, 1966, 1967, and 1968
 Named to the NHL's Second All-Star Team in 1965 and 1970.
 Played in NHL All-Star Game in 1964, 1967, 1968, 1969, 1971, 1972, 1973, 1974, and 1975
 Won the Lester Patrick Trophy in 1976
 The only player in NHL history to win the Hart, Art Ross, and Lady Byng trophies in the same season, doing so in consecutive seasons, in 1966–67 and 1967–68
 Was named to Team Canada for the 1972 Summit Series, but only played two games due to injuries
 In 1998, he was ranked number 17 on The Hockey News list of the 100 greatest NHL players
 Mikita's number 21 was retired by the Blackhawks on October 19, 1980; he was the first player to have his jersey number retired by the Blackhawks
 Mikita was inducted into the Hockey Hall of Fame in 1983
 Mikita was inducted into the Slovak Hockey Hall of Fame in 2002
 The ice rink in Ružomberok, Slovakia, is named after him
 In 2011, statues of Mikita and Bobby Hull were installed outside the United Center, where the Blackhawks currently play
 The first player of Slovak origin who won the Stanley Cup

See also
 List of NHL statistical leaders
 List of NHL players with 1,000 points
 List of NHL players with 500 goals
 List of NHL players with 1,000 games played

References

External links

 

1940 births
2018 deaths
Art Ross Trophy winners
Canadian ice hockey centres
Canadian people of Slovak descent
Canadian sports announcers
Chicago Blackhawks captains
Chicago Blackhawks players
Czechoslovak emigrants to Canada
Hart Memorial Trophy winners
Hockey Hall of Fame inductees
Ice hockey people from Ontario
Lady Byng Memorial Trophy winners
Lester Patrick Trophy recipients
National Hockey League All-Stars
National Hockey League broadcasters
National Hockey League players with retired numbers
People from Liptovský Mikuláš District
Sportspeople from the Žilina Region
Sportspeople from St. Catharines
St. Catharines Teepees players
Stanley Cup champions
Canadian expatriate ice hockey players in the United States